County Route 106 may refer to:

 County Route 106 (Albany County, New York)
 County Route 106 (Bergen County, New Jersey)
 County Route 106 (Cortland County, New York)
 County Route 106 (Erie County, New York)
 County Route 106 (Nassau County, New York)
 County Route 106 (Orange County, New York)
 County Route 106 (Orleans County, New York)
 County Route 106 (Rockland County, New York)
 County Route 106 (Schenectady County, New York)
 County Route 106 (Suffolk County, New York)
 County Route 106 (Westchester County, New York)